Caroli church may refer to:
Caroli church, Borås in Borås, Sweden, oldest building in Borås
Caroli Church, Malmö in Malmö, Sweden